Ice Claw is a children's novel by David Gilman, published in 2008. It is the second book in Gilman's Danger Zone series with its principal character, eco hero teenager Max Gordon. The first book is The Devil's Breath and the third Blood Sun.

Plot summary
Max Gordon is participating in an X-Treme sports challenge, where he witnesses the final moments of a mysterious Basque monk, who screams a cryptic clue before plummeting to his death. The clue is a prophecy that predicts an ecological catastrophe that will kill millions around Europe.

When he is blamed for the monk's death, Max and his best friend Sayid follow the clues and discover betrayal and murder around every turn before meeting the man behind it all: the insane billionaire Tishenko.

Main characters
Max Gordon:
The protagonist from the first novel comes back in this second book, and again the story is mainly shown from his point of view.

Sophie Fauvre:
An attractive young heroine that Max falls for. She plays more or less exactly the same role as Keelie van Reenen, from the first book.

Tishenko:
A billionaire madman with a crazy plot to threaten the environment. He is an outcast with a hideous physical deformity. He plays the same role as Shaka Chang, from the first book.

2008 British novels
British children's novels
2008 children's books
Penguin Press books